CSS Tuscaloosa may refer to: